The Unknown was a 1915 film directed by J. E. Mathews released in support of The Sunny South or The Whirlwind of Fate (1915).

It is considered a lost film.

Cast
Jack Kearns
Mick King
Peter Felix
Jeff Smith
Frank Longhrey

Production
The movie was shot in Newcastle over December 1914 and January 1915.

It starred two boxers and vaudeville star Jack Kearns.

Reception
The film premiered at Waddington's Globe Theatre, George Street in Sydney. According to the Referee "Mick King, Herr Kearns, and Peter Felix have, in this picture, displayed surprising histrionic ability."

The Motion Picture News called it "a really good comedy, Keystone in appearance".

References

1915 films
Australian silent short films
Lost Australian films
Australian black-and-white films